Macrotrachela is a genus of rotifers belonging to the family Philodinidae.

The species of this genus are found in Europe, Northern America and southernmost Southern Hemisphere.

Species

Species:

Macrotrachela aculeata 
Macrotrachela allani 
Macrotrachela ambigua

References

Bdelloidea
Rotifer genera